The Bill Gaither Trio, originally simply The Gaither Trio, was an American gospel music group, last consisting of Bill, his wife Gloria Gaither, and Michael English.

History
By 1957, The Gaither Trio—consisting of siblings Bill, Danny, and Mary Ann—was singing at churches and religious events.

In 1962, Danny graduated from college and went to Ohio to teach. His move brought about a change in the trio, as Gloria began "singing with the trio in the place of Dan." At that time, Bill and Gloria were high school teachers; Mary Ann was a college freshman. By 1966, Danny had rejoined the trio, with Gloria having had a baby.

Recognition
Among the honors of the group, include two Grammys and 17 Dove Awards. The group was inducted into the Gospel Music Association Hall of Fame in 1999. They were also nicknamed the masters of gospel "feel-good music".

- Receiving 17 Dove Awards from Gospel Music Association of the United States to recognize outstanding achievement in the Christian music industry.

- The Gaither Trio is recognised as the most influential christian artists from 1950's to the present day.

- Their songs touched so many that had hearts of stone, it was obvious that the Gaither Trio was more than a singing group...It was a family of warm blooded hearts, loving each other and all, emotionally physically, and mentally. Loving all under the wings of the Gaither extended family.

Members
Lead
 Danny Gaither (1956–1962, 1966–1977) (died April 6, 2001)
 Gary McSpadden (1977–1988) (died April 15, 2020)
 Michael English (1989–1991)

Alto
 Mary Ann Gaither (1956–1964; 1965–1966) (died April 25, 2018)
 Gloria Gaither (1964–1991)
 Sherry Slattery (1966–1967)
 Betty Fair (1967–1970)

Baritone
 Bill Gaither (1956–1991)

Discography

1966: Sincerely (Heartwarming Records)
1966: When God Seems So Near (Bill, Danny & Mary Ann)
1967: Happiness (Bill, Danny & Sherry Slattery)
1968: I'm Free (Bill, Danny & Gloria)
1969: He Touched Me (Heartwarming)
1969: Sings Warm (Heartwarming)
1970: At Home In Indiana
1971: The King Is Coming
1972: Live (2 LPs)
1972: Christmas...Back Home In Indiana
1972: My Faith Still Holds
1973: Especially For Children Of All Ages
1973: Let's Just Praise The Lord
1974: Something Beautiful: An Evening With The Bill Gaither Trio (Live; 2 LPs)
1974: Because He Lives
1974: Thanks For Sunshine
1975: I Am A Promise
1975: Jesus, We Just Want To Thank You
1976: Praise
1977: My Heart Can Sing – The Inspiring Songs of Stuart Hamblen
1977: Moments For Forever (Live; 2 LPs)
1978: Pilgrim's Progress (Bill, Gloria & Gary)
1978: I Am Loved (Bill, Gloria & Gary)
1979: We Are Persuaded
1979: He Touched Me
1981: Bless The Lord Who Reigns In Beauty
1982: He Started The Whole World Singing
1983: Fully Alive
1984: Ten New Songs With Kids...For Kids About Life
1985: Then He Said Sing
1987: Welcome Back Home
1990: Hymn Classics (Bill, Gloria & Michael)

Compilations
1978: Classics (Impact Records)
1978: The Very Best Of The Very Best (Word Records)
1980: The Very Best Of The Very Best...For Kids
1992: Best Of The Gaithers...Live!
1994: Oh Happy Day Vol. 1 & 2
1994: Precious Memories
1996: Our Recollections
2000: Bill Gaither Trio, Vol. 1–4

GREATEST HITS:

He Touched Me
The King is Coming
Jesus Is Lord Of All
The Family Of God
I Am A Promise
The Church Triumphant
I Am Loved
There's Something About That Name
I Will Serve Thee
God Gave The Song
Joy Comes In The Morning
You're Something Special
Because He Lives
I Just Feel Like Something Good Is About To Happen
Something Beautiful
The Longer I Serve Him
It is Finished
Sinner Saved By Grace
Old Friends
Let's Just Praise The Lord
The Old Rugged Cross Made The Difference

References 

American Christian musical groups
Family musical groups
Grammy Award winners
Southern gospel performers